Marx W. Wartofsky (1928–1997) was an American philosopher, specialising in historical epistemology. He was a professor of philosophy at Baruch College and the Graduate Center of the City University of New York and the editor of The Philosophical Forum. With Robert S. Cohen, he co-founded the Boston University Center for Philosophy and History of Science, in 1960.

His works include Feuerbach (Cambridge University Press, 1977), a philosophical and historical critique of German philosopher and moralist Ludwig Andreas Feuerbach; Conceptual Foundations of Scientific Thought (Macmillan, 1968) and Models: Representation and Scientific Understanding (1979), inquiries into the meaning of scientific models and metaphors.

References

External links
Feuerbach. Marx W. Wartofsky. Cambridge University Press, 1977. 
Models: Representation and the Scientific Understanding. Marx W. Wartofsky. Springer Science & Business Media, 1979. 

1928 births
1997 deaths
People from Brooklyn
20th-century American philosophers
Columbia University alumni
Boston University faculty
Baruch College faculty